Kathleen Winsor (October 16, 1919 – May 26, 2003) was an American author. She is best known for her first work, the 1944 historical novel Forever Amber. The novel, racy for its time, became a runaway bestseller even as it drew criticism from some authorities for its depictions of sexuality. She wrote seven other novels, none of which matched the success of her debut.

Early life
Winsor was born October 16, 1919 in Olivia, Minnesota but raised in Berkeley, California. Her father was a real-estate dealer.

At the age of 18, Winsor made a list of her goals for life. Among those was her hope to write a best-selling novel.

Winsor graduated in 1938 from the University of California, Berkeley. During her school years, she married a fellow student, All-American college football player Robert Herwig. In 1937, she began writing a thrice-weekly sports column for the Oakland Tribune. Although that job only lasted a year, Winsor remained at the newspaper, working as a receptionist. She was fired in 1938 when the newspaper chose to trim its workforce.

Career

Forever Amber
Winsor became interested in the Restoration period through her husband. Herwig was writing a paper for school on Charles II, and, out of boredom, Winsor read one of his research books.

Her husband joined the military at the outbreak of World War II and spent five years with the United States Marines fighting in the Pacific theatre. During that time, Winsor studied the Restoration period, claiming to have read 356 books on the subject. She began writing a novel based on her research. Her fifth draft of the novel was accepted for publication. The publishers promptly edited the book down to one-fifth of its original size. The resulting novel, Forever Amber, was 972 pages long. The novel took readers on a frolic through Restoration England and offered vivid images of fashion, politics, affairs and public disasters of the time, including the plague and the Great Fire of London.

The book appeared in 1944. It attracted criticism for its blatant sexual references. Fourteen U.S. states banned it as pornography and the Hays Office also condemned it, but within a month the movie rights had been purchased by Twentieth Century Fox. The film, directed by Otto Preminger and starring Linda Darnell and Cornel Wilde, was released in 1947.

Despite being banned, Forever Amber became one of the bestselling American novels of the 1940s. It sold over 100,000 copies in its first week of release, and went on to sell over three million copies.

Later career
Made a celebrity by the success of her novel, Winsor found it unthinkable to return to the married life she had known with Herwig and, in 1946, they divorced. Ten days later, she became the sixth wife of the big-band leader and clarinetist Artie Shaw, despite the fact that two years previously Shaw had castigated his then-wife, Ava Gardner, for reading such a "trashy novel" as Forever Amber. The marriage to Shaw ended in 1948, and Winsor soon married her divorce attorney, Arnold Krakower. That marriage likewise ended in divorce, in 1953. In 1956 Winsor married for the fourth time, to Paul A. Porter, a former head of the Federal Communications Commission. They remained married until Porter's death in 1975.

Winsor's next commercially successful novel, Star Money, appeared in 1950, and was a portrait closely drawn from her experience of becoming a bestselling author. But in five subsequent novels, the last appearing in 1986 – The Lovers, Calais, Robert and Arabella, Jacintha, and Wanderers Eastward, Wanderers West – she failed to make as much of an impact. In 2000 a new edition of Forever Amber was published with a foreword by Barbara Taylor Bradford.

Death
Winsor died May 26, 2003 in New York City.

Works

Forever Amber (1944) 
Star Money (1950) 
The Lovers (1952) 
America, With Love (1954) 
Wanderers Eastward, Wanderers West (1965) 
Calais (1979) 
Jacintha (1984) 
Robert and Arabella (1986)

Papers 
Winsor's manuscripts and research from 1940-1949 are at The Harry Ransom Humanities Research Center at the University of Texas at Austin.

Notes

References
Guardian Unlimited obituary on Kathleen Winsor

External links
Lise Jaillant, "Subversive Middlebrow: The Campaigns to Ban Kathleen Winsor’s Forever Amber in the United States and in Canada." International Journal of Canadian Studies (Special issue on Print Culture and the Middlebrow, ed. Michelle Smith & Faye Hammill) 48 (2014): 33-52.
Guardian Unlimited book review of Forever Amber by Elaine Showalter, August 2002.
Time magazine book review, October 1957, of America, With Love.

1919 births
2003 deaths
20th-century American novelists
20th-century American women writers
American historical novelists
American romantic fiction writers
American women novelists
People from Olivia, Minnesota
Writers from Berkeley, California
Writers of historical fiction set in the early modern period
21st-century American women